A by-election for the Tasmanian House of Assembly was held in the Division of Denison in the Australian state of Tasmania on Saturday 16 February 1980.

Background
The election was the first to use the Robson Rotation, a method of rotating names on ballot papers. In previous elections, candidates were listed in alphabetical order by surname.

By-elections are not usually held in the Tasmanian House of Assembly because casual vacancies are filled by a recount of votes, a system that has been in place since 1917.

On 18 December 1979 the Supreme Court of Tasmania ordered that the election of three candidates in the 1979 election be declared void. The court found that Julian Amos, John Devine and John Green had exceeded their spending limits. As a result, all elected members for the electorate of Denison were required to face another election.

Elected Members
The election resulted in two previously elected members losing their seats: John Green from the Labor Party and Bob Baker from the Liberal Party. Elected in their place were Norm Sanders from the Democrats and Liberal Gabriel Haros.

The following candidates were elected, listed in order of election:

Result

References

Further reading
 Denison form guide 2006 , Poll Bludger, 2006. Quoting an article by Wayne Crawford of The Mercury in 2002.

1980 elections in Australia
Tasmania state by-elections
1980s in Tasmania